Process safety focuses on preventing fires, explosions and chemical accidents in chemical process facilities or other facilities dealing with hazardous materials such as refineries, and oil and gas (onshore and offshore) production installations.

Occupational safety and health primarily covers the management of personal safety. Well developed management systems also address process safety issues. The tools, techniques, programs etc. required to manage both process and occupational safety can sometimes be the same (for example a work permit system) and in other cases may have very different approaches. LOPA (Layers of Protection Analysis) or QRA (Quantified Risk Assessment) for example focus on process safety whereas PPE (Personal Protective Equipment) is very much an individual focused occupational safety issue.

A common tool used to explain the various different but connected systems related to achieving process safety is described by James T. Reason's Swiss cheese model. In this model, barriers that prevent, detect, control and mitigate a major accident are depicted as slices, each having a number of holes. The holes represent imperfections in the barrier, which can be defined as specific performance standards. The better managed the barrier, the smaller these holes will be. When a major accident happens, this is invariably because all the imperfections in the barriers (the holes) have lined up. It is the multiplicity of barriers that provide the protection.

Process safety generally refers to the prevention of unintentional releases of chemicals, energy, or other potentially dangerous materials (including steam) during the course of chemical processes that can have a serious effect to the plant and environment. Process safety involves, for example, the prevention of leaks, spills, equipment malfunction, over-pressures, over-temperatures, corrosion, metal fatigue and other similar conditions. Process safety programs focus on design and engineering of facilities, maintenance of equipment, effective alarms, effective control points, procedures and training. It is sometimes useful to consider process safety as the outcome or result of a wide range of technical, management and operational disciplines coming together in an organised way.
Process safety chemists will examine both:
 Desired chemical reaction, using a reaction calorimeter: this will allow a good measure of not only the reaction heat to be ascertained, but also to examine how much heat is "accumulated" during the various additions of chemicals (i.e. How much heat could be evolved if anything went wrong.  The chemist will then (if necessary) vary the reactions conditions to arrive at a process that the proposed plant can control (i.e. the heat output is significantly less than the cooling capacity of the plant), and has low accumulation (meaning that in the event of any problem, the current addition can be stopped without any danger of overheating)
 Undesired chemical reaction, using one or more of:
Differential scanning calorimeter
Reactive screening device
Adiabatic calorimeter
These instruments are typically used for examining crude materials that are intended to be purified by distillation - these results will allow the chemist to decide on a maximum temperature limit for a process, that will not give rise to a thermal runaway.

See also
Functional safety
Process safety management

References

External links